Lynda Mekzine (born 8 October 1975) is an Algerian judoka. She competed in the women's half-lightweight event at the 1996 Summer Olympics.

References

External links
 

1975 births
Living people
Algerian female judoka
Olympic judoka of Algeria
Judoka at the 1996 Summer Olympics
Place of birth missing (living people)
Mediterranean Games bronze medalists for Algeria
Mediterranean Games medalists in judo
Competitors at the 1997 Mediterranean Games
21st-century Algerian people
African Games medalists in judo
Competitors at the 1995 All-Africa Games
African Games bronze medalists for Algeria